The 1969 Washington State Cougars football team was an American football team that represented Washington State University in the Pacific-8 Conference (Pac-8) during the 1969 NCAA University Division football season. Under second-year head coach Jim Sweeney, the Cougars compiled a 1–9 record (0–7 in Pac-8, last), and were outscored 339 to 143. Two home games were played on campus in Pullman at Rogers Field, with two at Joe Albi Stadium in Spokane.

The team's statistical leaders included Jack Wigmore with 876 passing yards, Richard Lee Smith with 485 rushing yards, and Fred Moore with 523 receiving yards.

Washington State won their opener at Illinois by a point with a late field goal, then lost nine straight. They did not play Palouse neighbor Idaho in 1969; outside of war years without teams (1943, 1944), it was the first break in the series since 1900. The game was dropped this season (and in 1971) to allow the Cougars to schedule all seven conference opponents.

Both WSU and Washington entered the Apple Cup in Seattle winless (0–6) in conference play; the Huskies won their only game of the season to avoid the Pac-8 cellar. It was the first game of the series played on artificial turf.

This was the last football season for Rogers Field, as its south grandstand (and press box) suffered a suspicious fire the following April, moving all home games in 1970 and 1971 to Joe Albi in Spokane. It was also the final year for natural grass on Cougar home fields (Rogers, Joe Albi). The game against Pacific on November 1 was the last on campus in Pullman for nearly three years, until the debut of Martin Stadium in September 1972.

Schedule

Roster

All-conference

One Washington State defensive back, junior cornerback Lionel Thomas, was named to the All-Pac-8 team. On the second team (honorable mention) was senior defensive end  Dave Crema. From Ohio, Thomas played junior college football at Wenatchee; he had six interceptions to co-lead the Pac-8, with a leading return yardage of 156 yards, highlighted by a 93-yard touchdown against UCLA.

NFL Draft
Three Cougars were selected in the 1970 NFL Draft

Vest was a former player (1967) who was with the Seattle Rangers of the Continental Football League.

References

External links
 Game program: Oregon at WSU – October 4, 1969
 Game program: Pacific at WSU – November 1. 1969

Washington State
Washington State Cougars football seasons
Washington State Cougars football